Mark Hildreth is the name of:

 Mark Hildreth (actor) (born 1978), Canadian actor
 Mark Hildreth (born 1967), American former wrestler known by his ring name Van Hammer